The Clyde River (Dhurga: Bhundoo) is an open intermediate tide dominated drowned valley estuary, or perennial river that flows into the Tasman Sea at Batemans Bay, located in the South Coast region of New South Wales, Australia.

Course and features
The Clyde River rises below Kangaroo Hill in the Budawang Range, part of the Great Dividing Range, within Budawang National Park, south of the locality of Sassafras, and flows generally southwards parallel to the east coast, joined by nine tributaries including the Bimberamala, Yadboro, and Buckenbowra rivers, before turning east and reaching its mouth of the Tasman Sea at Batemans Bay. The river descends  over its  course.

The river is one of the last major rivers in eastern Australia that has not been dammed. Porters Creek, a tributary of one of the Clyde's tributaries, Pigeon House Creek, is dammed by the Porters Creek Dam, which supplies water to coastal towns.

In its upper reaches, the river forms within the Budawang National Park; while in its lower reaches, the river flows through the Clyde River National Park.

Water quality of the basin is very good.  The upper catchment is heavily timbered (state forests and national parks); there is a small amount of logging in the Yadboro State Forest. There are no polluting industries in its catchment, nor any sewage outflows, and thus the river has a reputation for the cleanest, least polluted waters of any major river in eastern Australia.

History and naming

The region was first occupied by the Walbunja people from the Yuin nation.
Their name for the river, Bhundoo, means "Deep Water".

The river was given the name Clyde River after the River Clyde in Glasgow, Scotland, by Lieutenant Robert Johnston, who navigated the river aboard the cutter Snapper on 1 December 1821.

Crossings 
The river crossings, from its headwaters to its river mouth, include:

 Yadboro Flats bridge, from Yadboro Road to Western Distributor Road, downstream from the junction with Yadboro River
 Clyde Ridge Road bridge
 Shallow Crossing, on The River Road, a concrete causeway/ford, at the tidal limit of the Clyde estuary
 Nelligen bridge, on the Kings Highway
 Batemans Bay bridge, on the Princes Highway. The old steel truss bridge has been replaced by a new, higher bridge with two lanes for traffic in each direction. The new bridge formally opened on 27 March 2021, after which the old bridge was dismantled. The new bridge is designed to ease traffic congestion and delays caused by the limitations of the old bridge, which only had one narrow lane in each direction. In addition, the old bridge had a central section which is raised to allow tall watercraft to pass underneath. This meant regular delays for local and holiday traffic which was frequently backed up for several kilometres as a result.

Gallery

See also

 Rivers of New South Wales
 List of rivers of New South Wales (A–K)
 List of rivers of Australia

References

External links
 

 
 

Rivers of New South Wales
South Coast (New South Wales)